Bupyeong also refers to:
 Bupyeong, Incheon, an area of Incheon
 Bupyeong District, a district of Incheon
 Bupyeong-dong, a neighborhood of Incheon
 Bupyeong Station, a subway station located in Bupyeong District
 Bupyeong-dong, Busan, a neighborhood of Busan